Tipong Pinoy is a Philippine television informative show broadcast by GMA Network. It was produced by the National Commission for Culture and the Arts (NCCA).

It is a 30-minute youth-orientated magazine-style show which features different aspects of both traditional and contemporary Filipino culture such as food, pop culture, beliefs and arts. Wency Cornejo and the late Susan Calo-Medina were the show's presenters.

Reruns of Tipong Pinoy are currently aired on the Knowledge Channel. It was formerly aired on IBC and The Mabuhay Channel.

Hosts
GMA Network
Susan Calo-Medina
Wency Cornejo

Studio 23
Janelle So
Alfred Vargas

Episodes
Cavite in History
Philippine Fiestas
Manila and Intramuros
Women in the Revolution
Trading in the Philippines
What is Filipino Music
Education
Islam
Cordillera
Indigenous Music
Philippine Drama
Courtship Practices
Western Influenced Filipino
Jeepney as a Folk
Museum
Pinoy Komiks
Philippine Cinema
Pinoy Food
Philippine Games and Toys
Todos Los Santos
Intramuros
The Wonders of Folk Medicines, Superstition and Beliefs
Earth, Wind, Fire and Water Lores
Philippine Dance
Philippine Architecture
Filipino Christmas

References

External links
 

1998 Philippine television series debuts
1999 Philippine television series endings
2003 Philippine television series debuts
2004 Philippine television series endings
ABS-CBN original programming
Filipino-language television shows
GMA Network original programming
Intercontinental Broadcasting Corporation original programming